Marmik (Marathi: मार्मिक Mārmik) meaning: [Straight from the heart/A silent word that goes directly to the Heart]  is an Indian weekly published by the Shiv Sena from Mumbai, until publication of its daily Saamana it was Shiv Sena's organ. It is seen as the frontrunner or launchpad for the Shiv Sena party. It focused on issues of common Marathi man or Maratha Manoos including unemployment, influx of migrant, retrenchment of Marathi workers and its office in Ranade Road became the rallying point for Marathi youth. It was Marmik issue on 5 June 1966 which first announced the launch of membership for the Shiv Sena. Bal Thackeray later stated "that not just a cartoon weekly but also the prime reason for the birth and growth of the Sena.".

History
Bal Thackeray, started as a cartoonist for The Free Press Journal. In 1960 when he was 34, he quit his job and started Marmik. He was joined by his younger brother Shrikant Thackeray. It was launched on 13 August 1960  and it was inaugurated by the then Maharashtra chief Minister Yashwantrao Chavan. Bal Thakre's cartoons used to be published in Marmik. It basically mock maharashtra government policies and raise unemployment issue.

References

News magazines published in India
Bal Thackeray
Publications established in 1960
1960 establishments in Maharashtra
Mass media in Mumbai
India articles needing attention